The Center for Reproductive Rights (CRR) is a global legal advocacy organization that seeks to advance reproductive rights, such as abortion. The organization's stated mission is to "use the law to advance reproductive freedom as a fundamental human right that all governments are legally obligated to protect, respect, and fulfill." Founded by Janet Benshoof in 1992, its original name was the Center for Reproductive Law and Policy.

The Center for Reproductive Rights is headquartered in New York City. The Center continually monitors the treatment of reproductive rights in various media in the U.S. and abroad.

CharityWatch rates the Center for Reproductive Rights "B+".

History
In July 2011, the CRR filed suit against the state of North Dakota over a state law that would ban all medical abortions. In July 2013, the CRR, along with the Red River Women's Clinic, filed a lawsuit against the enactment of so-called "fetal heartbeat", genetic, and sex selection restrictions on abortions. In September 2013, a federal judge dismissed the genetic and sex selection parts of the lawsuit without prejudice.

In 2011 the CRR joined with the American Civil Liberties Union (ACLU) and Planned Parenthood to challenge a law passed which requires women to get an ultrasound four hours before an abortion. In addition, it requires the doctor to put the ultrasound image within the view of the woman and describe it. The plaintiffs have called it an "ideological message," and a violation of the First Amendment. And since the patient is not actually required to listen to what the doctor describes and can even choose to wear blinders and headphones, the plaintiffs went on to call it a "farce."

After suing the Obama administration over the restricted access to birth control, in June 2013 the U.S. Department of Justice ordered that the Obama administration make all forms of emergency contraception available over the counter and without an age restriction.

In recent years, CRR has been one of three primary groups challenging increased state level restrictions to reproductive health and abortion care. In May, the CRR and the ACLU jointly filed suit against a 12-week abortion ban in Arkansas. In June the CRR filed a lawsuit against the state of Kansas to block HB 2253 stating that the abortion restrictions it imposed are unconstitutional. In August a coalition of groups, including the CRR, filed suit in Oklahoma to block enforcement of a law that restricts access to emergency contraception, stating that the law is unconstitutional. In August a federal judge blocked the law from going into effect.

In November 2015, the United States Supreme Court agreed to review stringent restrictions enacted into law by abortion opponents in Texas.  Upon coming into force the laws would leave Texas, a state with a population of 27 million, served by only ten clinics, 34 less than the number in service before the laws were enacted.  The appeal, handled by the CRR, is U.S. Supreme Court docket number 16-274, Whole Woman's Health v. Cole.  It is the first case that the high court has accepted scrutinizing abortion restriction since 2007.

In 2016 the CRR expanded its international program, including the launch of an international litigation campaign that has included the first abortion case decided by the United Nations Human Rights Committee and the first case to frame preventable maternal deaths as a human rights violation.

See also 
 Center for Reproductive Law & Policy v. Bush

References

Human rights organizations based in the United States
Reproductive rights organizations
Non-profit organizations based in New York City
Abortion-rights organizations in the United States
1992 establishments in New York City